Joceline is a unisex given name. People with the name include:

Feminine use 
Joceline Clemencia (1952–2011), Afro-Curaçaoan writer and linguist
Joceline Lega, French applied mathematician
Joceline Monteiro (born 1990), Portuguese athlete
Joceline Sanschagrin (born 1950), Canadian writer
Joceline Schriemer, Canadian politician

Male use 
Joceline of Furness (fl. 1175–1214), English Cistercian hagiographer
Jocelin of Wells (died 1242), Bishop of Bath

See also
Josceline Percy, 11th Earl of Northumberland (1644–1670), English peer

Unisex given names